Zaviyeh-ye Sadat (also Romanized as Zāvīyeh-ye Sādāt and Zāvīeh Sādāt; also known as Zeīwa and Zeyva) is a village in Khanandabil-e Sharqi Rural District, in the Central District of Khalkhal County, Ardabil Province, Iran. At the 2006 census, its population was 300, in 76 families.

References 

Towns and villages in Khalkhal County